The 1919 season of the Auckland Rugby League was its 11th. It was the first season post World War I and unsurprisingly it saw a resurgence in playing numbers with 56 teams across the six grades. North Shore Albions who had previously dropped out of the senior competition again fielded a senior side. As did Otahuhu, who had dropped out during the 1917 season. Ponsonby United won their third consecutive first grade title, while Newton Rangers won the Roope Rooster trophy.

The season was also summarised by the league as well. Forty-nine teams were entered across all grades. Sunnyside won the second grade, Manukau won the third grade, City won the fourth and fifty grades, while Ponsonby won the sixth grade. It was stated that the standard of play in the senior club competition was not as good as it would have been due to the fact that 19 of the best club players from Auckland were away for a large part of the season representing New Zealand in Australia.

Club news

Marist Old Boys enter first grade
A new club was formed, namely Marist Old Boys. They were composed of old boys of the Marist Brothers’ schools. The senior club season commenced on 3 May.

Eden Ramblers club folds and Point Chevalier is founded 
At the Auckland Rugby League meeting on 30 April it was announced that the Eden Ramblers club had been disbanded. They had formed in 1911 and played in the senior competition from 1911 to 1913 before becoming a lower grade club until this season. Curiously though 3 weeks earlier on April 5 however it was reported that a "new club that has just been affiliated is the Eden Ramblers, boys from Avondale and Point Chevalier". The new team however was not to become known as the Eden Ramblers but in fact were named Point Chevalier. Point Chevalier however did not field any teams in the 1919 season and it wasn't until the 1920 season that they were officially registered with the league.

Charitable efforts and league funds 
During the war most of the revenue gained by Auckland Rugby League was donated to the war efforts meaning they could not make much progress financially towards developing the game and facilities. In 1919 they once again raised 75 pounds to distribute to local charities nominated by the mayor. They also put on a match at the end of the season to raise money for the St. John Ambulance Brigade. Due to the large crowds at some of the matches, including the match with Australia it was anticipated that the league would gain over 1,000 pounds to establish a fund for obtaining a playing ground. This would of course be Carlaw Park.

Scrum rules
At the end of the season J.B. Cooke stated in a meeting that next season the ball would be rolled into scrums and forwards would have to keep their feet on the ground while the halfback was putting the ball in. These changes were to “brighten the game”.

Representative season 
The Auckland representative team was only able to play one inter provincial fixture against Hawkes Bay after matches with Canterbury and Wellington were unable to be scheduled due to the busy New Zealand representative schedule. Likewise Ponsonby were unable to schedule a defense of the Thacker Shield for the same reason. An Auckland Junior team was however able to make a trip out to Napier to play Hawkes Bay and they were victorious by 12 points to 5. Auckland played a match in front of an enormous crowd at the Auckland Domain against the touring Australian side but did not fair any better than the New Zealand national side, going down by 32 points to 8.

Myers Cup (1st Grade championship)
Otahuhu's first grade team were to only last one round into the season before pulling out. Grafton also struggled to field a team when they lost players to the New Zealand team which was touring Australia. In round 6 rather than default they were provided with players from the City and Newton clubs however they too did not survive to the end of the competition. Ponsonby United won the championship for the third consecutive season.

Myers Cup standings
{|
|-
|

Myers Cup results

Round 1

Round 2

Round 3

Round 4
There was confusion with the Round 4 draw with the newspapers listing the match between North Shore and Maritime when in fact it was Newton who were supposed to be the opponent. As a result, Newton players did not arrive at the ground. Eventually Newton found enough substitutes but they still began the game 2–3 players short. In spite of this they still managed to win by 14 points to 9. Also the City team took the field with 6 juniors while Grafton had 2 juniors and played a man short. The chief issue was with the New Zealand team touring Australia at the time meaning many key players were absent from their club teams.

Round 5
In the match at Devonport the Marist team was led from the field by their captain with the score at 9–0 to North Shore in protest at a refereeing decision. During the round 5 match between Marist and North Shore the Marist team left the field early in protest against the referee. After hearing the report of referee Cleal, and a statement from McDevett, the Marist captain it was decided to suspend McDevett for 12 months after it was he who had told the referee that he would be taking his team from the field in protest and proceeded to do so.

Round 6
Grafton were not able to field a full team and were reinforced by players from Newton who had a bye. This was done so that they would not be forced to drop out of the competition. They were missing test players Karl Ifwersen and Dougie McGregor.

Round 7

Round 8

Round 9
The Auckland Star reported that the matches at Victoria Park saw the largest crowds for club games ever on that ground.

Round 10
Round 10 featured two rarities. The Newton v North Shore match was played as a curtain-raiser to the Ponsonby v Maritime match on Auckland Domain 1. When matches were normally played at the same venue they all were played at the same time of 3pm on adjacent fields. In the 3rd match due to be played on the Domain the referee, Freeman Thompson failed to turn up and after waiting for 40 minutes the decision was made to abandon the game. It was later revealed that he had been called away on an urgent business matter and had tried to contact the league but been unable to. The Auckland Rugby League accepted his explanation. The round was also significant for another reason. Craddock Dufty debuted for Newton and kicked 2 conversions. He was to go on to represent New Zealand along with touring with the New Zealand Maori side.

Round 4 postponed match

Roope Rooster knockout competition
The round 1 match between Ponsonby United and Newton Rangers was abandoned towards the end with Newton leading by 12 points to 10 after Ponsonby supporters encroached on the field in protest against the referee and refused to move back. Marist Old Boys recorded their first competitive win in their history with a round 1 win over North Shore Albions. The final was won by Newton Rangers after they defeated Maritime by 8 points to 5.

Round 1
In the Newton match with Ponsonby there was no crossbar and so they tied a piece of string between the two posts to act as a makeshift marker for kicks at goal.

Round 1 replay

Semi final

Final

Top try scorers and point scorers
The following point scoring lists include Senior Championship matches and the Roope Rooster competition matches only. George Davidson the champion New Zealand sprinter, who represented New Zealand at the 1920 Olympics top scored with 64 points and he also led the league with 14 tries.

Several teams featured multiple players with the same surname with many sets of brothers. As a result, some of the scoring lists are inaccurate. For Ponsonby Laurie Cadman scored 1, his brother Arthur Cadman scored 2, and "Cadman" scored 3. Laurie was also a boxer and in June 11 or 12, 1925 he disappeared from the Manaia steamer which was traveling from Tauranga to Auckland. His body was never found.

Lower grades 
There were 5 lower grades in 1919. In the middle of the season the Post & Telegraph Football Club asked to be affiliated to the Maritime Football Club which had been formed a year earlier. This request was approved by the league.

Second grade
Sunnyside won the championship after an 8-8 draw with City Rovers in the last round of the season. Sunnyside had been leading the competition at the time with City in second place. The City club asked for a rematch but were refused by the Junior Management Committee. Thames Old Boys, Marist Old Boys, and Newton Rangers all withdrew after round 2. There were 22 scores/results reported, with 26 scores/results not reported therefor the standings are considerably incomplete.
{|
|-
|

Third grade
The third grade initially had 6 teams entered but several withdrew during the season and only Northcote and Manukau completed the season. Manukau won the competition and were undefeated however there were only 3 scores reported in the entire season (Northcote 0 Ponsonby 0, Manukau 18 Otahuhu 0, and Otahuhu 13 Ponsonby 0). Otahuhu also recorded a default win over Sunnyside in round 1 with the Sunnyside team then withdrawing from the competition. Thames Old Boys withdrew after round 2, Otahuhu following round 6, and Ponsonby following round 7. This left Northcote and Manukau to play each other on July 5, July 12, and July 19 before the competition stopped. None of these results were reported. 
{|
|-
|

Fourth grade
City were reported to have finished one point ahead of Otahuhu and Maritime. Then followed Sunnyside, Richmond, and Northcote. Though there were a large number of results not reported so the table is incomplete. During the season the Post & Telegraph club affiliated with the Maritime Football Club and subsequently assumed that name. Grafton Athletic withdrew after 6 rounds, as did Manukau.
{|
|-
|

Fifth grade
City Rovers won the competition. Sunnyside withdrew after the first round after defaulting their match with City. Newton and Maritime withdrew from the competition after 2 rounds. At the time the Maritime team was in fact Post & Telegraph, but their club became affiliated with the Maritime Football Club mid season.
{|
|-
|

Sixth grade
Ponsonby United were one competition point ahead of City when they then beat them 7-3 in the curtain-raiser to the 3rd test between New Zealand and Australia. This was the penultimate round and sealed the championship for Ponsonby. Sunnyside withdrew after 2 rounds, while Manukau withdrew after 11 rounds.

Auckland Rugby League seasons
Auckland Rugby League